In the 2005 season, Shelbourne finished 3rd in the League of Ireland Premier Division.

Personnel

Managerial/Backroom Staff

Manager: Pat Fenlon
Assistant Manager: Eamon Collins

2005 Squad Members

 (Captain)

In on loan

Out on loan

Results/League Tables

League of Ireland Premier Division

Final league table

League Results summary

League Form/Results by Round

UEFA Champions League

First Qualifying Round

Shelbourne won 6 – 2 on aggregate

Second Qualifying Round

Steaua Bucharest won 4 – 1 on aggregate

FAI Carlsberg Cup

Second Round

eircom League Cup

Second Round

Quarter-Finals

Semi-Finals

Setanta Cup

Group 2

Group 2 table

Final

2005 Season Statistics

Player Appearances/Goals

As of November 18, 2005.

|}

Top Goalscorers

References

2005
Shelbourne
Shels